Arvinder Singh Lovely (3 January 1965 – 1 November 2021) was an Indian politician. He was elected as an MLA from Deoli constituency of Delhi, on an Indian National Congress ticket in 2008. In 2015, he joined Bharatiya Janata Party, after Congress denied a ticket to his father Buta Singh. He left BJP in 2019 to join Indian National Congress again. In 2020, he contested from Deoli constituency of Delhi on the Indian National Congress ticket and lost.

Political career 
Arvinder Singh was born to former minister and veteran Congress leader Buta Singh, in a Scheduled Caste Sikh family. In the 2008 Delhi Assembly elections, Congress gave him a ticket from Deoli. His father, who was the Chairman of National Commission for Scheduled Castes at that time, took leave from work to campaign for him. He achieved a surprise victory, defeating BSP's Sreelal by a big margin of 16,627 votes.

In 2010, he raised the issue of reservation for scheduled castes in Delhi Sikh Gurdwara Management Committee. The proposal was shot down by his namesake Arvinder Singh Lovely, who was the Delhi Gurudwara election and administration minister at that time.

In the 2013 Delhi Assembly elections, he was defeated by Prakash Jarwal of AAP. In 2015, he left Congress to join BJP.

References 

1965 births
2021 deaths
Bharatiya Janata Party politicians from Delhi
Delhi MLAs 2008–2013
Indian National Congress politicians from Punjab, India
Politicians from Ludhiana